Renato Kelić (born 31 March 1991) is a Croatian professional footballer who plays as a centre back who plays for Chonburi in Thailand.

Honours
Slovan Liberec
 Czech First League: 2011–12

Universitatea Craiova
Cupa României: 2017–18
Supercupa României: Runner-up 2018

Chonburi
 Thai FA Cup: Runner-up 2020–21

External links

1991 births
Living people
Sportspeople from Vinkovci
Association football central defenders
Croatian footballers
Croatia youth international footballers
Croatia under-21 international footballers
FC Slovan Liberec players
Calcio Padova players
Puskás Akadémia FC players
CS Universitatea Craiova players
HNK Cibalia players
Renato Kelic
Renato Kelic
Czech First League players
Serie B players
Nemzeti Bajnokság I players
Liga I players
First Football League (Croatia) players
Renato Kelic
Croatian expatriate footballers
Expatriate footballers in the Czech Republic
Expatriate footballers in Italy
Expatriate footballers in Hungary
Expatriate footballers in Romania
Expatriate footballers in Thailand
Croatian expatriate sportspeople in the Czech Republic
Croatian expatriate sportspeople in Italy
Croatian expatriate sportspeople in Hungary
Croatian expatriate sportspeople in Romania
Croatian expatriate sportspeople in Thailand